Pregnancy-associated malaria (PAM) or placental malaria is a presentation of the common illness that is particularly life-threatening to both mother and developing fetus. PAM is caused primarily by infection with Plasmodium falciparum, the most dangerous of the four species of malaria-causing parasites that infect humans. During pregnancy, a woman faces a much higher risk of contracting malaria and of associated complications. Prevention and treatment of malaria are essential components of prenatal care in areas where the parasite is endemic – tropical and subtropical geographic areas. Placental malaria has also been demonstrated to occur in animal models, including in rodent and non-human primate models.

While the average adult citizen of an endemic region possesses some immunity to the parasite, pregnancy causes complications that leave the woman and fetus extremely vulnerable. The parasite interferes with transmission of vital substances through the fetal placenta, often resulting in stillbirth, spontaneous abortion, or dangerously low birth weight. The tragedy of malaria in developing countries, particularly sub-Saharan Africa, receives abundant attention from the international health community, but until recently PAM and its unique complications were not adequately addressed.

Signs and symptoms
Some initial symptoms of malaria include feeling unwell, experiencing headaches and fatigue, and having muscle aches and abdominal pain. This can eventually progress to a fever. Other common symptoms consist of nausea, vomiting, and orthostatic hypertension. Malaria can also lead to seizures which may precede going into a comatose state.

In regions of high transmission, such as Africa, women experiencing PAM may exhibit normal symptoms of malaria, but may also be asymptomatic or present with more mild symptoms, including a lack of the characteristic fever. This is due to the fact that these women most likely have partial immunity, which may prevent a woman from seeking treatment despite the danger to herself and her unborn child. Conversely, in regions of low malaria transmission, PAM is associated with a higher likelihood of symptoms as these women most likely did not acquire immunity.

Cause

Transmission 
Transmission of malaria occurs when humans get bitten by infected mosquitos carrying the parasite known as Plasmodium falciparum. The saliva from the mosquito transfers the P. falciparum into the blood as sporozoites which then travel to the liver where they are converted to the merozite form and further replicated. After undergoing these changes in the liver, the parasite is then able to infect erythrocytes in the bloodstream. It can take 7 to 30 days after being bitten by a mosquito before symptoms start to arise. It is believed that pregnant women are more susceptible to malaria infection due to being immunocompromised and because infected erythrocytes tend to congregate around the placenta. As a result, the WHO recommends that pregnant women avoid traveling to high endemic regions.

Risk Factors 
The disease results from the aggregation of erythrocytes infected by Plasmodium falciparum which have been shown to adhere to chondroitin sulfate A (CSA) on placental proteoglycans causing them to accumulate in the intervillous spaces of the placenta, blocking the crucial flow of nutrients from mother to embryo. Infected erythrocytes express the VAR2CSA variant of P. falciparum Erythrocyte Membrane Protein 1 (PfEMP1) which allows them to bind to CSA on the placenta. The accumulation of infected erythrocytes in the placenta inhibit the exchange of nutrients between the mother and fetus and also causes local inflammation.

In areas of high malaria transmission such as Africa, women experiencing their first pregnancies have the highest risk of infection compared to in lower transmission areas where the number of pregnancies has less of an effect on infection rates. This is because women who are pregnant for the first time generally lack antibodies to VAR2CSA on erythrocytes that have been infected by the parasite. Women are most susceptible to malaria infection early on in the first trimester but the risk of infection decreases in the second trimester due to the development of antibodies to the infectious agent over time following the initial exposure. The infection risk also decreases after successive pregnancies.

Women that are infected with human immunodeficiency virus (HIV) are also at a high risk of having a higher parasite burden within the placenta during pregnancy. This increased parasite burden can show up as increased reporting of symptoms associated with PAM and an increased likelihood of adverse maternal and fetal outcomes. There is also an increased risk of an HIV positive woman developing pregnancy-associated malaria in subsequent pregnancies. Although the exact biological mechanism around how HIV and malaria disease states affect each other, it is thought that each condition affects how the immune system reacts to the other condition.

Mechanism
P. falciparum expresses proteins on the surface of parasite-infected erythrocytes (IE) helping them bind to an unusually low-sulfated form of chondroitin sulfate A (CSA) in the placental intervillous space. By this process, the parasite avoids being filtered through the spleen where it would be cleared from the bloodstream and killed. When selected in vitro for CSA-binding, the only upregulated gene expressed in the P. falciparum parasites was the var2csa gene. Parasite clones where the var2csa gene was disrupted lost the ability to adhere to CSA by blocking the binding of IE. Its protein, VAR2CSA (Variant Surface antigen 2-CSA), belongs to the Plasmodium falciparum erythrocyte membrane protein 1 (PfEMP1) family and contains six Duffy binding-like (DBL) domains. The regions that mediate binding to CSA have not been defined, but DBL2, DBL3, and DBL6 have shown the highest affinity for CSA binding when testing with recombinant single-domains.

A unique var gene (PFL0030c or var2csa) encodes this particular PfEMP1, which is differently regulated than other genes from the var family. It is also only expressed as protein in pregnant women, even though the transcript is present in children, men and non-pregnant women. It has a unique regulatory region, a uORF located upstream from the ORF that codes for the VAR2CSA protein. The expression of a protein named PTEF (after Plasmodium falciparum translation-enhancing factor) has been described to be necessary for the translation machinery to overcome the uORF and produce VAR2CSA protein, but the mechanism behind it remains to be elucidated.

Maternal and fetal outcomes 
In general, women with PAM have a higher likelihood of premature birth and their infants having a low birthweight. In examination of possible malarial immunity, some studies have shown that the presence of P. falciparum antibodies (specifically CSA adhesion inhibitory antibodies or IgG antibodies) may decrease the likelihood of low birthweight in the infants of women who have had pregnancy-associated malaria, but these findings do not specifically correlate to malarial immunity during pregnancy. However, the relationship between many P. falciparum antibodies during pregnancy and maternal and birth outcomes remains variable.

Lower birthweight of infants born from mothers with PAM can be attributed to placental infection, as well as other complications such as anemia and malnutrition, since the malarial parasite can be passed vertically from mother to the infant via infected red blood cells. Children who are born with a below-average birthweight are at risk for other health problems, including increased risk of mortality.

Anemia is a great concern as an adverse effect of pregnancy-associated malaria, since it can be life-threatening to the mother. Its cause is often compounded with other factors, such as nutrition and genetics. Some studies have suggested that iron supplementation can help with maternal anemia, but more research on malaria-endemic regions is required to make a better recommendation for mothers with PAM.

One systematic review showed that children of women with PAM are also more likely to contract clinical malaria and P. falciparum parasitaemia, although the reasoning for this is uncertain.

Maternal death is one of the biggest complications of malaria in some areas during epidemics. Furthermore, its cause is compounded with other malarial complications, such as anemia.

Prevention 
Prevention of pregnancy-associated malaria can be done with the use of various antimalarial drugs that are given before or during pregnancy to susceptible populations. Some of the antimalarial drugs used include Chloroquine, Mefloquine, and Sulfadoxine/pyrimethamine since they are safe for use during pregnancy. For regions of moderate or high malaria risk, preventative measures include insecticide-treated nets (ITNs) and intermittent preventive treatment in pregnancy (IPTp). ITNs act as two layers of protection, one from the physical net and another from the chemical nature and effects of the insecticide. Because IPTp plays a role in altering the immune response that the infant can display, the World Health Organization recommends starting IPTp as soon as possible during the 2nd trimester. These treatments are with doses of Sulfadoxine/pyrimethamine and are given at each antenatal visit, as long as the visits are one month apart. One concern with the use of Sulfadoxine/pyrimethamine along with other antimalarial drugs is P. falciparum developing resistance. In areas that have higher rates of resistance to the antimalarial Sulfadoxine/pyrimethamine, two doses of the drug is effective in reducing maternal parasitemia in women that do not have HIV while more doses are needed to reduce maternal parasitemia in HIV positive women.

Management

Non-pharmacological treatment 
Non-pharmacological treatment of PAM consists of utilizing the Artemisia annua plant as an herbal remedy. The basis for this reasoning is because A. annua acts as the plant source for Artemisinin-based combination therapy (ACT), a commonly used pharmacological treatment of PAM. However, the WHO currently does not support the use of A. annua as there are no standardization guidelines for plant harvest and preparation. Additionally, its clinical safety and efficacy have not yet been proven.

Pharmacological treatment 
Treatment of PAM is highly dependent on the mother's current pregnancy stage (i.e. trimester) and the species responsible for the disease transmission.

For infection caused by P. falciparum, the WHO recommends during the first trimester a treatment consisting of both Quinine and Clindamycin for a duration of 7 days. During the second and third trimester, the WHO recommendations of ACT, are the same as ones for non-pregnant individuals.

For infection caused by the other species, which include Plasmodium malariae, Plasmodium vivax, and Plasmodium ovale, the WHO recommends Chloroquine or Quinine during the first trimester. Quinine is used as an alternative if chloroquine-resistance is detected. During the second and third trimester, the WHO recommends either ACT or Chloroquine. If chloroquine-resistance is detected, ACT is the treatment of choice. The Centers for Disease Control and Prevention (CDC) has similar recommendations to the WHO.

Epidemiology 
Globally, an estimated 125 million or more pregnant women per year risk contracting PAM. Pregnancy-related malaria causes around 100,000 infant deaths each year, due in large part to low birth weight.

Due to the nature of disease transmission (i.e. via mosquitoes) and life cycle of the parasite, malaria is prevalent in warm, humid climates, such as tropical and subtropical regions. Consistent with previous years, the incidence of malaria in general is greatest in African regions, specifically sub-Saharan Africa, as defined by the World Health Organization (WHO), although there was a decline in numbers from 2010 to 2018. Particularly, in Central and West Africa, the number of pregnancies with malarial infection reached around 35% of all pregnancies in those regions in 2018. The regions that follow Africa in terms of malaria cases are Southeast Asia and the Mediterranean, although it is important to note that Africa has the largest number of cases by far; these regions comprise over 90% of the global incidences of malaria.

In the realm of pregnancy, individual immunity and level of transmission within the area play an important role in the malarial complications that manifest. For example, areas with high level of transmission are also associated with higher incidence of immunity. Therefore, infection from P. falciparum is usually associated with no symptoms in pregnant women. However, it is not to conclude that the presence of P. falciparum is completely benign, as it has been associated with maternal anaemia. Specifically, in these settings, women in their first pregnancy are at greatest risk of complications that arise from P. falciparum. Similarly to P. falciparum, Plasmodium vivax (P. vivax), another malarial pathogen found primarily in Asia and South America, has also been associated with maternal anaemia and low birthweight. On the contrary, women who live in areas with lower transmission are at a very high risk of adverse malarial outcomes despite their number of pregnancies.

Research Directions
	Each VAR2CSA domain has a potential affinity to CSA, but there are large areas not exposed to the immune system and appear to be buried in the quaternary structure. Data has indicated that these domains interact, forming a binding site that is specific for low-sulfated CSA found in the placenta. The binding of antibodies to one of these domains would prevent adhesion of parasitic IE in the placenta.

Moreover, studies have shown that women acquire immunity to PAM through antibody recognition of the VAR2CSA domain, also known as VSAPAM, after exposure during their first pregnancy. By measuring circulating levels of IgG antibodies that presumably target VAR2SCA, the study demonstrated that subsequent pregnancies confer progressively greater protection to PAM. Thus, PfEMP1 proteins such as the VAR2CSA domain could prove attractive as potential candidates for vaccine targets.

Additional genetic testing relating to pregnancy-associated malaria is currently being researched which involves looking at glucose-6-phosphate dehydrogenase (G6PD) which is an enzyme that is responsible for keeping red blood cells protected from being destroyed too soon by things such as foods and medications. The gene for this enzyme is found on the X chromosome which means that women in particular can have G6PD function that is normal, intermediate (which often shows up on lab tests as normal), and deficient. This gene is important in determining if certain antimalarial drugs such as Primaquine and Tafenoquine can be used since these antimalarial drugs are more likely to cause red blood cell hemolysis in women with a G6PD deficiency and worsen any anemia that comes from the malaria infection. Although these drugs would most likely be used after delivery for treatment of pregnancy-associated malaria, this genetic testing can help avoid inducing anemia in women more prone to red blood cell breakdown.

A vaccine to prevent a pregnancy-associated malaria called PAMVAC is currently undergoing clinical trials. PAMVAC is based on a recombinant form of the VAR2CSA domain and has been shown to be well-tolerated when injected in malaria-naive volunteers while also successfully inducing the production of antibodies against VAR2CSA.  Although the vaccine was injected in healthy participants who did not have malaria, the study provided insight into the vaccine's safety before administration into the target population – women with PAM.

A second vaccine candidate against pregnancy-associated malaria called PRIMVAC is also currently undergoing clinical trials in healthy adult women as a 3 dose course. This vaccine is based on the DBL1x-2x domain of VAR2CSA which is able to bind to CSA in the placenta. In preclinical studies, PRIMVAC injected in rats led to the production of antibodies against VAR2CSA on infected erythrocytes and also resulted in reduction of their binding to CSA. The vaccine was also shown to be well-tolerated in rats without any notable adverse reactions.

References

Further reading 

 
 
 

Malaria
Health issues in pregnancy